Hetes is a village in Somogy county, Hungary.

Etymology
According to legends its name came from the word hetes referring to seven houses of the village.

References

External links 
 
 Street map (Hungarian)

Populated places in Somogy County